Tatobotys africana is a moth in the family Crambidae. It was described by Jean Ghesquière in 1942. It is found in the area of the former province Équateur in the Democratic Republic of the Congo.

References

Moths described in 1942
Spilomelinae